The 2013–14 Sydney Sixers season was the club's third consecutive season in the Big Bash League (BBL).

Players

Squad
Players with international caps are listed in bold.

Transfers

In:

Out:

Review
Sydney Sixers were much improved from the previous season's disappointing result. The club registered six wins from the eight in the group stage to qualify for the finals series. However, they lost in the semi-final against Perth Scorchers.

The first match of the campaign began against cross-town rivals Sydney Thunder at home (Sydney Cricket Ground). Sixers won the toss, electing to field. They were able to restrict the Thunder to 166 runs, with Usman Khawaja scoring 66. Sixers chased down the runs with 10 balls to spare. Player of the Match, Nic Maddinson expertly guided the Sixers to victory with 61 runs.

The second match was a very lopsided encounter. After sending the Melbourne Stars in, the Sixers were unable to restrict their opponents total effectively. The Stars scored 200 runs which proved very difficult to chase down. The Sixers ended with a total of 9/123 by the end of the allotted 20 overs.

The Sixers went on a two-game winning streak, defeating Brisbane Heat and  Adelaide Strikers on the road. After losing both tosses, the Sixers were able to firstly restrict the Heat to 7/136 when chasing the 140 runs posted by the Sixers, and then successfully chase down the Strikers 7/149 with 5 balls to spare.

The Sixers fifth match of the tournament proved to be one of the most exciting in BBL03, with the game going to a super over. However it was not meant to be for the Sixers. The club lost this game in heartbreaking fashion after only being able to conjure up one run from their super over. Scorchers all rounder Adam Voges picked off the run with a boundary from the first ball of Brett Lee's super over.
The game itself was a thrilling one for the spectators with many twists and turns. The Scorchers began proceedings horrifically losing two wickets without score from the first over of the game by Brett Lee. A superb 129 run partnership between Simon Katich and Sam Whiteman steadied the ship before Whiteman was eventually bowled by Lee in the eighteenth over. Voges then guided the Scorchers to a total of 153. 
In reply, the Sixers had trouble of their own keeping wickets in hand. With regular opener Michael Lumb out for the game, Stephen O'Keefe partnered Nic Maddinson at the top of the order. Both looked to move the scores on but fell cheaply. Then when Moises Henriques and Marcus North both returned to the pavilion without troubling the scorers the Sixers were 4/20. Scorchers bowler Tim Behrendorff was the destroyer with 3/21 from his four overs. Steve Smith and Jordan Silk did some rebuilding of their own before Silk gifted Voges an easy return catch. Smith continued scoring runs and looked in fine form as he reached his half century. The Sixers seemed like they would now easily make the runs. However, the game turned on its head once more when Dan Smith attempted to play a reverse sweep only to scoop the ball to fine leg. With the Scorchers eyeing off the Sixers tail-enders, Steve Smith took it upon himself to finish the game. A mistimed shot of the bowling of Yasir Arafat saw him caught at short third man by Voges with the Sixers 7/131. Lyon quickly departed and the Scorchers looked destined to win. However, the nineteenth over by Thomas saw some big hitting by Lee and Chris Tremlett leaving the Sixers with just 7 runs of the final over by Arafat to win. Neither side could quite find the slice of luck to get the win in ordinary time. With Lee out bowled, Tremlett faced the final delivery needing two runs to win. He dug out the ball from Arafat who couldn't quite hold onto out bumping it out to cover. The Sixers scampered through for a single leaving the scores tied. 
The Sixers super over was disastrous as Steve Smith was out bowled from the first ball attempting a low-percentage lap sweep. Henriques soon followed caught in the gully region for a pair of ducks for the night. Their super over ended at 2/1 from four balls. The one run scored by Maddinson was easily surpassed by the Scorchers as Voges flicked Lee's first ball through the leg side for a boundary.

The Sixers then returned to the winners circle, going on a three-game streak. They defeated Hobart Hurricanes at home, Melbourne Renegades at Docklands Stadium and Sydney Thunder at Stadium Australia on their way to finishing second on the ladder.

In a rain-affected final against soon-becoming-rival Perth Scorchers, the Scorchers fell 6 runs short of the 54-run target set by Scorchers according to the Duckworth–Lewis method. The semi-finals loss saw them bow out of the tournament. The result means they did not qualify for the 2014 Champions League Twenty20 tournament.

Champions League Twenty20
As the Sydney Sixers finished seventh in the 2012–13 Big Bash League season, they did not qualify for the 2013 Champions League Twenty20 tournament. This means they are unable to defend their title that they won in 2012.

Big Bash League

Regular season

Ladder

Matches

Finals

References

External links
Official site

Sydney Sixers seasons